The rail transport system in Denmark consists of 2,633 km of railway lines, of which the Copenhagen S-train network, the main line Helsingør-Copenhagen-Padborg (at the German border), and the Lunderskov-Esbjerg line are electrified. Most traffic is passenger trains, although there is considerable transit goods traffic between Sweden and Germany.

Maintenance work on most Danish railway lines is done by Banedanmark, a state-owned company that also allocates tracks for train operators. The majority of passenger trains are operated by DSB, with Arriva and Nordjyske Jernbaner operating on some lines in Jutland. Goods transport is mainly performed by DB Schenker Rail, although other operators take care of a significant portion of the non-transit traffic.

Denmark is a member of the International Union of Railways (UIC). The UIC Country Code for Denmark is 86.

History
The Kingdom of Denmark's first railway opened between Copenhagen and Roskilde in 1847. The first railway in the Danish Duchy of Schleswig opened between Flensburg and Tønning in 1854.

The first railways in Denmark were built and operated by private companies. The railways in Funen and Jutland were built by Peto and Betts who also supplied the locomotives (built by Canada Works, Birkenhead). Most of the technical staff was also recruited from Britain, notably from the Eastern Counties Railway. When Peto and Betts went into insolvency, the Danish state took over Det danske Jernbane-Driftsselskab (The Danish Railway Operating Company) as of 1 September 1867 under the name De jysk-fyenske Jernbaner (the Funen and Jutland Railways), from 1874 De danske Statsbaner i Jylland og Fyn (The Danish State Railways in Jutland and Funen). The network was extended by new construction and by acquisition of the privately operated lines from Silkeborg to Herning (1 November 1879) and from Grenaa to Randers and Aarhus (1 April 1881).

The Danish state took over Det sjællandske Jernbaneselskab (the Railway Company of Zealand) on 1 January 1880, forming De sjællandske Statsbaner (the State Railways of Zealand). With the majority of railways on both sides of the Great Belt thus owned by the Danish state, it was not until 1 October 1885 that the companies of Jutland/Funen and Zealand merged into one national railway company, De danske Statsbaner (the Danish State Railways), the merger being finalised on 1 April 1893.

Important projects that followed for the Danish rail network include the Great Belt Fixed Link in 1998, the Øresund Bridge in 2000 and the Copenhagen–Ringsted Line (Denmark's first high-speed rail) in 2019.

Network

Tracks 

Banedanmark is in charge of 2,045 km of railway lines, which do not include the lines controlled by private railways. The narrow gauge lines generally disappeared during the 1950s and 1960s.

The maximum speed allowed on main lines is generally 180 km/h, with less trafficked lines usually allowing between 75 and 120 km/h; the speed may be lowered in places due to the condition of the track. While wooden sleepers are used on sidings and branch lines, concrete sleepers are the norm on all main lines; the common two-block concrete sleepers are now being phased out in favour of monoblock ones.

The age of the tracks in Banedanmark's network has become increasingly problematic in later years. A 2002/03 analysis of Banestyrelsen's (now Banedanmark) network states that the average age of the track is too high, with a present average age of 24 years compared to the recommended 20 years.

Banedanmark also owns the S-train lines, but does not own every railway in the country. It does not own local railways around Hillerød (such as Frederiksværk Line and Gribskov Line) and Østbanen, Odsherred Line, Tølløse Line, Thy Line, Lemvigbanen, Aarhus Letbane and Copenhagen Metro.

Electrification 
General-purpose electric propulsion was adopted quite recently in Denmark; the political decision to electrify the main lines was made in 1979. The first line to be electrified was Copenhagen–Helsingør, electrified in 1986, followed by the main line across Zealand, Funen and Southern Jutland in the 1980s–90s. On the main lines that are equipped with them, the overhead lines carry 25 kV AC at 50 Hz. The system is used on the main line from Sweden through Copenhagen to Fredericia, and from there to Padborg and the German border. Both Sweden and Germany use 15 kV at 16 Hz and 16.7 Hz respectively, and the multi-system class EG goods locomotive is equipped for both 25 and 15 kV.

The S-train network in Copenhagen operates at 1650 V DC, supplied from overhead lines; the Copenhagen Metro uses 750 V DC, supplied from a third rail. It was the first electric network in Denmark, electrified around 1930.

Since there are heavy delays (several years) with the construction of the new diesel multiple unit IC4, many debaters argue that it is better to electrify major railways and purchase electric multiple units instead, since that is a more common product. At least the route Fredericia-Ålborg must be electrified in order to run electric passenger trains between Jutland and Copenhagen. The route between Kolding-Esbjerg was due to be to open for electric trains in 2015. The government has in 2009 decided to delay all electrification for several years until the new signal system ERTMS is introduced, since electrification earlier than that requires rebuilding of the existing signal system.

In September 2013 the government reached a deal with the Danish People's Party and the Red-Green Alliance (Denmark) to use additional oil taxes to create a train fund. This would allow for travel between the cities of Copenhagen, Odense, Esbjerg, Aarhus, and Aalborg in four hours.

On 29 May 2015 Banedanmark announced a 2.8 billion DKK (€375 million) contract to have Aarsleff-Siemens electrify 1300 km of tracks before 2026.

Safety and signalling
Main lines were equipped with the ATC safety system during the 1990s, with a partial, cheaper implementation, ATC train stop, being used on some (but not all) branch lines. A different system, HKT, which was introduced in 1975 and utilises cab signalling, is used on the S-train network, although a simplified version, "forenklet HKT" (F-HKT), is used on some of the lines.

Denmark has its own ATC system (ZUB 123), not compatible with other countries. It is a modification of the Swiss system. Trains crossing the border to Sweden or Germany have to have two ATC systems, and handle two electrical supply systems.

In order to replace the different and aging signal systems, it has been decided to replace all current signal systems on Banedanmark's active network, except the S-train lines, with ERTMS level 2, relying entirely on cab signalling; general rollout is scheduled for 2018–21. The S-train network is set to be refitted with a suitable urban rail system, possibly a CBTC system allowing driverless trains, by 2020.

Safety record
Serious incidents on Denmark's railways have been rare. The six most serious are:

1897: The Gentofte train crash. A delayed local train was hit by a special train. 40 were killed and 132 were injured in the accident.
1913: The Bramminge train accident. An express train became derailed near Bramming. 15 were killed, including Peter Sabroe, and 54 injured.
1919: The Vigerslev train crash. An express train from Korsør drove violently into five wagons at Vigerslev. The train was stationary due to an emergency application of the brakes and reversing to retrieve a child who had fallen onto the rails. 40 died and 30 were severely injured.
1967: The . An express train hit another outside Odense. 11 people died while 47 were injured in the accident.
1988: The 1988 Sorø derailment. A train ran off the rails at high speed at Sorø. Eight people died and 72 were injured.
2019: The Great Belt Bridge rail accident. A passenger train collided with a semi-trailer from a passing freight train. Eight people died and 16 were injured.

Future expansion
As part of ongoing plans for high-speed rail in Denmark, new corridors and lines are being planned; including the Vestfyn Line between Odense and Middelfart and a new Hovedgård-Hasselager line. Other regional rail plans include a new Aarhus–Silkeborg line and a line to Billund.

Operations

Urban rail transport 

Urban rail transport in Denmark currently consists of one metro system in Copenhagen, one light rail system in Aarhus and two commuter rail systems, the S-Train in Copenhagen and the Aalborg Commuter Rail. Copenhagen had a tram network from 1863 until 1972 when trams were replaced by buses and private cars because they were considered an outdated form of transportation. Odense Letbane as well as Greater Copenhagen Light Rail are under construction.

A rapid transit proposed for the Øresund metropolitan area, the Øresund Metro is also under discussion.

Copenhagen Metro 

The Copenhagen Metro is an automated, 24-hour rapid transit system which serves Denmark's capital city, Copenhagen. It began operation in 2002. It is also the only rapid transit system in Denmark. As of March 2020, the system consists of four lines: M1, M2, M3 and M4. Planning of the Metro started in 1992 as part of the redevelopment plans for Ørestad with construction starting in 1996, and stage 1, from Nørreport to Vestamager and Lergravsparken, opened in 2002. Stage 2, from Nørreport to Vanløse, opened in 2003, followed by stage 3, from Lergravsparken to Lufthavnen, in 2007. 
The City Circle Line is an entirely underground 15.5 km loop through central Copenhagen and Frederiksberg with 17 stops. It does not share any track with the M1 and M2 lines, but intersect them at Kongens Nytorv and Frederiksberg stations. With the City loop opened, the Metro expects that its ridership should almost double from its 2016 levels to 116 million annual passengers. 
A fourth line, M4, will be developed into a separate line between 2020 and 2024, as extensions of the Cityringen to Nordhavn and Sydhavn open. The two-stop three-kilometre-long line to Nordhavn opened in March 2020. The extension adds an interchange with Nordhavn S-train station. The five-stop, 4.5 km, extension to Sydhavn is also under construction, with planned opening in 2024. The Sydhavn line will terminate at Ny Ellebjerg where it will create a new regional rail transport hub by connecting the metro system to the S-train network, regional trains, and long-distance trains on the current lines and the upcoming high speed Copenhagen-Ringsted railway. Once these extensions are complete, Metro expects the daily ridership to triple from its current level of 200,000 riders per weekday to 600,000 riders per weekday in 2030.

Aarhus light rail

The Aarhus Letbane (Aarhus light rail) is a light rail system in the city of Aarhus, Denmark. It is operated by the company Midttrafik. The first line opened in December 2017, but the system is under continuous development and expansion. Service on the intercity section Odder to Lisbjergskolen opened on 25 August 2018. A third intercity line to Grenå opened on 30 April 2019. More lines are being planned. 
On 8 May 2012, the Danish Parliament approved the construction of the first line; work to build Phase 1 commenced during September 2013. It was originally planned to open in August 2016, but this was delayed, in part due to legislative issues in relation to railway safety. 
Two types of rolling stock have been operated over the first line, conventional trams which are slower and restricted to only running along some parts of the route and hybrid tram-trains that can be operated on the conventional heavy rail network, the latter being used for the long-distance services.

Railway operators
 
Railway undertakings currently operating in Denmark:

 Arriva
 CFL cargo
 DSB
 Lokaltog
 Metro Service A/S, running Copenhagen Metro
 MJBA – Midtjyske Jernbaner
 NJ – Nordjyske Jernbaner
 SJ AB (formerly Statens Järnvägar)
 DB Cargo

Connection to adjacent countries by rail 
Denmark has railway connections to Sweden and Germany, both of which use the same rail gauge as in Denmark. The electric voltage is different as Sweden and Germany use 15 kV AC while Denmark uses 25 kV AC. The train protection systems are also different between all three countries. This means that locomotives must be specially modified to cross the borders, while railway wagons can freely cross the border if there is a suitable locomotive.

Connections to Sweden use the Øresund Railway across Øresund Bridge. Services include SJ's X 2000 service to Stockholm and Øresundståg commuter services to Malmö Central Station and beyond.

There are two connections to Germany. The main connection is over land at Padborg, which carries ICE, intercity and regional trains to Hamburg, and used to carry EuroNight and CityNightLine trains to Amsterdam via Cologne, Basel via Frankfurt, Munich via Nürnberg, and Prague via Berlin. The second crossing is overland at Tønder, Denmark and Süderlügum, Germany, which connects to Niebüll. The Vogelfluglinie route, is from December 2019 closed for trains, until then carried EuroCity and ICE services, using the train ferry from Rødby, Denmark to Puttgarden on the island of Fehmarn, Germany, and from there proceeded via Lübeck and Hamburg to Berlin. The Rødby ferry and Tønder crossing allow only diesel powered trains, while the Padborg crossing is electrified. The Fehmarn Belt Fixed Link is a planned connection across the Fehmarnbelt between Denmark and Germany.

Since November 2014, CityNightLine does not service Denmark anymore, and as of 2022 the only sleeper trains serving Denmark are Snälltåget's seasonal services to Berlin and the Austrian Alps.

Image gallery

See also 
 History of rail transport in Denmark
 High-speed rail in Denmark
 List of railway lines in Denmark
 Narrow gauge railways in Denmark
 Transportation in Denmark
 Rail transport by country

Notes

External links 

 Banedanmark
 DSB
 Danish Railway Signaling
 Arriva Tog
 Railion Danmark
 Rejseplanen - official search engine for all public transport by rail and bus in Denmark
  illustrated description of Denmark's railways in the 1930s